Iommi is the debut solo album by British heavy metal band Black Sabbath guitarist Tony Iommi.

The album took nearly five years to make. All of the songs were written by Iommi, producer Bob Marlette and the respective vocalists of each track (except "Black Oblivion", which was written by Iommi and Billy Corgan).

According to Iommi, he and Phil Anselmo had recorded three tracks together for the album, but only one was put onto the album. Iommi has also said he "wrote a couple of tracks with Billy Idol and two with Billy Corgan, but you know, we could only use one of each".

Other songs written
In an interview with Cosmik Conversations, Iommi said that they "actually wrote a few tracks with Billy [Idol]...three with Phil Anselmo...and two tracks with Billy Corgan, but you know, we could only use one of each." There is also a track entitled "Something Wicked This Way Comes" written and recorded with Scooter Ward of the band Cold that was not included on the album. The bulk of the music for that track was used for Peter Steele's song, "Just Say No to Love". The track has been available through various filesharing networks. One of the unreleased tracks with Phil Anselmo is a faster-paced song entitled "Inversion of the Saviours". It has also been available through various file sharing networks.

Black Sabbath band members on the album 
Iommi's career is closely linked to his time in Black Sabbath, a band he led from its formation in 1968 to its semi-retirement in 1999, and has continued to lead during sporadic reunions (in 2001, in some form or another every year from 2004 to 2007 and again from 2011 to 2017). Subsequently, Iommi formed the band Heaven & Hell, a group featuring a collection of former Black Sabbath band members that had performed together under the Black Sabbath name in the past.

A number of musicians associated with Black Sabbath appear on Iommi. Track 9 features Black Sabbath vocalist Ozzy Osbourne (1968–1978, 1978–1979, 1996–2006, 2011–2017) and drummer Bill Ward (1968–1980, 1983, 1984, 1994, 1997–2006, 2011–2012). The track also features Laurence Cottle on bass, the session bassist for Black Sabbath's studio album Headless Cross. Cottle also features on tracks 3–5 and 7–9. Tracks 3 and 7 feature guitarist Brian May (of Queen), who had previously guest performed with Sabbath on their 1989 tour, performing a guitar solo on the Headless Cross album, and which Iommi played with him at The Freddie Mercury Tribute Concert in 1992.

Reception

In 2005, Iommi was ranked number 451 in Rock Hard magazine's book of The 500 Greatest Rock & Metal Albums of All Time.

Track listing

Credits 
Writing, performance and production credits are adapted from the album liner notes.

Personnel 
 Tony Iommi – guitars

Additional musicians
 Bob Marlette – keyboard, programming

Production 
 Ralph Baker – executive production
 Bob Marlette – production, engineering, mixing

Visual art 
 Art Shoji – art direction
 Maggie Magarian – art direction, design
 William Hames – photography
 Ross Halfin – photography
 Mike Clement – photography
 Gene Kirkland – photography
 JMO Design – logo

Studios 
 A&M Studios – recording
 Chipping Norton – recording
 Long View Farm – recording
 Sunset Marquis Hotel – recording
 Olympic Studios – recording

Charts

References 

2000 debut albums
Albums produced by Bob Marlette
Tony Iommi albums